Nova is the second single by Swedish duo The Sound of Arrows.

The singer of The Sound of Arrows, Stefan Storm, described what this song is about: "It’s a song that we actually struggled with a fair bit in its creation. It just wouldn’t sit right and we’ve got at least three different productions of it lying around on the computer, but it’s finally seeing the light. I’m very happy with how the lyrics came out in the end, the second verse especially."

Nova is about escapism, which is quite a common theme for The Sound of Arrows – kind of what the whole album is about: wanting something better when you're stuck in a rut and just driving toward an ideal. Sometimes, it can be great because it can get you places, but it's sometimes like you're diluting yourself into thinking that there is always something better out there. It goes both ways. It's somewhat like hope but still there is a part of hopelessness.

Video clip

There is a real cave in the video; it's about 200 – 300 meters below ground. The shooting took 48 hours. It was filmed in summer so it was super, super warm but very cold down in the cave. The experience of shooting the video was described as terrible, but worth it in the end.

 Artist: The Sound of Arrows
 Title: Nova (Geffen)
 Director: The Sound of Arrows, Mattias Erik Johansson
 Production Company: Naive, Black Neon, Shameless
 Producer: Pinar Metin, Joel Burman
 DoP: Sam Goldie
 1st AD: Christer Jonsson
 Make Up: Cissi Wallin
 Stylist: Fransicka Svensson
 Art Director): TSOA/Mattias Erik Johansson
 Gaffer: Anders Hedqvist
 Editor: Hannes Falk
 Colourist: Oskar Mellander
 Post Production: Oskar Gullstrand
 Styling: IR Erik Annerborn

Track listings

 CD
 «Nova» — 3:29
 «Nova» (Instrumental)
 «Nova» (Tiësto Remix)
 «Nova» (II Figures Remix)

vinyl 12"

Side A

 «Nova»
 «Nova» (Instrumental)

Side B

 «Nova» (Tiësto Remix)
 «Nova» (II Figures Remix)

 CDr

 «Nova» (Radio Edit) — 3:28
 «Nova» (Tiësto Remix) — 7:48
 «Nova» (Almighty Anthem Edit) — 3:39
 «Nova» (Almighty Anthem Remix) — 6:38
 «Nova» (Steep Remix) — 3:17

 CDr

 «Nova» (Almighty Essential Radio Edit) — 3:35
 «Nova» (Almighty Anthem Radio Edit) — 3:36
 «Nova» (Almighty Essential Club Mix) — 7:16
 «Nova» (Almighty Anthem Club Mix) — 6:31

Personnel

 The Sound of Arrows — lyrics, music, production

Miscellaneous awards and honors

References

External links
 
 Lyrics on LyricWiki

2011 singles
Geffen Records singles
Polydor Records singles
The Sound of Arrows songs